Caixas is a commune in the Pyrénées-Orientales department in southern France.

Geography

Localisation 
Caixas is located in the canton of Les Aspres and in the arrondissement of Perpignan.

Government and politics

Mayors

Population

See also
Communes of the Pyrénées-Orientales department
Caixas web site

References

Communes of Pyrénées-Orientales